Kevin Conroy (November 30, 1955 – November 10, 2022) was an American actor. He appeared in a variety of stage performances, television series, and television films, but earned worldwide fame for his voice portrayal of the DC Comics superhero Batman in various animated media, beginning with the acclaimed Batman: The Animated Series in 1992. Conroy went on to voice the character for multiple animated television series, feature films, and video games over the next three decades.

Early life
Conroy was born on November 30, 1955, in Westbury, New York, into an Irish Catholic family. He moved to Westport, Connecticut, when he was about 11 years old. He had three older siblings.

Due to the tumultuous environment in his home, Conroy lived with a family friend during his last year of high school. Conroy's father was an alcoholic and once attempted suicide while Conroy was in high school. In adulthood Conroy was estranged from his father for many years but reconciled shortly before his father's death. Conroy was at both his mother and his father's side when they died.

Conroy moved to New York City in 1973 when he earned a full scholarship to attend the Juilliard School's drama division, studying under actor John Houseman. While there, he roomed with Robin Williams, who was in the same group as both Conroy and Kelsey Grammer. After graduating from Juilliard in 1978, he toured with Houseman's acting group The Acting Company, and the following year he went on the national tour of Ira Levin's Deathtrap. Conroy and his co-star Brian Bedford did not get along, and got into an on-stage brawl during the opening night performance of Deathtrap at the Kennedy Center.

Career

Theatre
In 1980, after playing the role of Jerry Grove in the New York-based daytime soap opera Another World, Conroy moved out to California to pursue further work in television. Conroy became associated with the Old Globe Theatre in San Diego, California, where he performed in productions of Hamlet and A Midsummer Night's Dream. From 1980 to 1985, he acted in a variety of contemporary and classic theater pieces, including the Broadway productions of Edward Albee's adaptation of Lolita and Eastern Standard. He told The New York Times that, as a gay man living in New York in the time of the AIDS epidemic, he "went to so many funerals that I felt such a sense of obligation" to portray the character of a TV producer secretly living with AIDS in Eastern Standard.

Film and television
Conroy returned to television in the 1985 TV movie Covenant and had a role on another daytime soap drama, Search for Tomorrow. Conroy played gay lawyer Bart Fallmont on Dynasty from 1985 to 1986. He was a series regular on Ohara in 1987, and as the company commander on Tour of Duty from 1987 to 1988, before starring in a series of television movies. Though initially cast as one of the show's main characters, his role on the show was reduced while it filmed in Hawaii and he ended up spending much of his time making portraits of tourists on the Honolulu boardwalk. Conroy also guest starred on shows such as Cheers, Search for Tomorrow, Matlock and Murphy Brown.

Voice acting

As a voice actor, Conroy is best known for his starring role in Batman: The Animated Series (1992–1995). He was notably the first voice actor to alter his voice tone between portraying Batman and Bruce Wayne, which Michael Keaton had previously done in Tim Burton's live-action Batman films. However, Conroy based his dual-voice performance on Leslie Howard in the 1934 film The Scarlet Pimpernel. He continued to voice Batman in various animated spin-off productions, which collectively took place in what is known as the DC Animated Universe (DCAU). These spin-offs include the TV shows The New Batman Adventures (1997–1999), Batman Beyond (1999–2001, in which he portrays an elderly Bruce Wayne retired from crimefighting), Justice League (2001–2004), and Justice League Unlimited (2004–2006), as well as the theatrical film Batman: Mask of the Phantasm (1993), and the direct-to-video films Batman & Mr. Freeze: SubZero (1998), Batman Beyond: Return of the Joker (2000), and Batman: Mystery of the Batwoman (2003). He also voiced Batman for the character's guest appearances in the DCAU's Superman: The Animated Series, Static Shock and The Zeta Project.

Conroy went on to voice Batman in the direct-to-video DC Universe Animated Original Movies: Batman: Gotham Knight (2008), Superman/Batman: Public Enemies (2009), Superman/Batman: Apocalypse (2010), Justice League: Doom (2012), Justice League: The Flashpoint Paradox (2013), Batman: Assault on Arkham (2014), Batman: The Killing Joke (2016), Batman and Harley Quinn (2017), and Justice League vs. the Fatal Five (2019). He later returned to voicing Batman on TV for the animated series Justice League Action (2016-2018), along with guest appearances on Teen Titans Go! and Scooby-Doo and Guess Who?. In a tally of the actor's performances that include his every episode and movie portrayal of Batman, Conroy portrayed the character longer than any other actor in live-action and animation. The previous record-holder was Olan Soule, who voiced Batman in various animated works between the late 1960s and early 1980s (including Super Friends).

After the September 11, 2001 attacks in New York City, Conroy participated in relief efforts by volunteering to cook for police officers and firefighters. During an audio commentary on Batman: Gotham Knight, Conroy expressed his surprise at the reaction of the emergency service workers to his presence. At the behest of another cook, Conroy called out from the kitchen to the dining area in his "Batman voice", reciting the iconic line, "I am vengeance! I am the night! I am Batman!" (from the BTAS episode "Nothing to Fear"). This was greeted by cheers and applause from emergency service personnel, many of whom had been fans of Batman: The Animated Series during its airing in the 1990s. Conroy confessed to being humbled and deeply flattered by the reaction.

Conroy also voiced Batman for multiple video games, including the Batman: Arkham series. Following the release of Batman: Arkham Asylum (2009) and Batman: Arkham City (2011), he stated at the 2013 Dallas Comic Con that he had been working on "the next Arkham", leading to rampant speculation that he would reprise his role in Batman: Arkham Origins. In June 2013, however, it was confirmed that Conroy would not be involved in Arkham Origins, meaning Conroy may had been referring to a yet-unannounced game from the Arkham series. He would ultimately reprise the role for the fourth game in the series, titled Batman: Arkham Knight (2015).

He confirmed on Twitter in October 2013 that he had filmed a role on Tim Daly's web series The Daly Show, where Conroy parodied his role as Batman in a fight with Daly parodying Superman (whom Daly previously voiced in Superman: The Animated Series).

Conroy portrayed Bruce Wayne of Earth-99 in live-action in the Batwoman episode of Arrowverse crossover "Crisis on Infinite Earths". This was his only live-action portrayal of the character.

Mark Hamill, Conroy's frequent voice actor co-star as the Joker, spoke highly of working with Conroy. Regarding his willingness to be involved in a Batman-related project, Hamill says, "When they offer me roles now, I say, 'Is Kevin doing it?' ... I don't even have to read the script, if Kevin's doing it I'll do it."

Personal life 
In a 2016 interview with The New York Times promoting the animated adaptation of The Killing Joke, Conroy revealed that he was gay. As part of DC Comics' 2022 Pride anthology, Conroy wrote "Finding Batman", a story that recounted his life and experiences as a gay man. It received critical acclaim upon release. He was married to Vaughn C. Williams at the time of his death.

Conroy made an effort to conceal his homosexuality throughout most of his career. He spoke in "Finding Batman" about the discrimination he faced once potential collaborators and employers found out about his homosexuality. Conroy said that on multiple occasions he had been removed from consideration for acting jobs due to his sexual orientation.

Conroy made frequent appearances at comic book conventions; his last convention was in Connecticut in July 2022.

Death 
 

Conroy died at Mount Sinai Hospital in New York City from colorectal cancer on November 10, 2022, at age 66. He did not publicly disclose that he was ill. Conroy's death was announced in a press release issued by parent company Warner Bros. Discovery. 

Upon news of his death, DC Comics gave free online access to "Finding Batman" as a way to honor Conroy. His co-stars, such as Mark Hamill and Tim Daly, and other celebrities paid tribute on social media.

Filmography

Film

Television

Video games

Web

Theatre

Awards and nominations

References

External links

 
 
 
 

1955 births
2022 deaths
20th-century American male actors
21st-century American male actors
American gay actors
American male film actors
American male Shakespearean actors
American male stage actors
American male television actors
American male video game actors
American male voice actors
Catholics from Connecticut
Juilliard School alumni
LGBT people from Connecticut
LGBT Roman Catholics
People from Westbury, New York
People from Westport, Connecticut
Deaths from colorectal cancer
Deaths from cancer in New York (state)